The Weinstein effect is a global trend in which allegations of sexual misconduct by famous or powerful men are disclosed. The first of a worldwide wave of allegations were made in the United States in October 2017, when media outlets reported on the sexual abuse allegations made against film producer Harvey Weinstein. The allegations were described as a "tipping point" or "watershed moment" and precipitated a "national reckoning" against sexual harassment.

The effect gave rise to the #MeToo movement, which encourages people to share their experiences of sexual harassment and assault, and the two events triggered a cascade of allegations that brought about the swift removal of many men in positions of power in the United States. In the entertainment industry, allegations led to the dismissal of actors and directors alike.

History

Background
In July 2016, Fox News television host Gretchen Carlson filed a lawsuit against the station's chairman Roger Ailes, which led to his removal and encouraged journalists to pursue rumors about the conduct of Weinstein and political commentator Bill O'Reilly. Similar revelations and a lawsuit led to O'Reilly being fired in April 2017. Both Ailes and O'Reilly denied wrongdoing. Ailes died in May 2017.

On October 5, 2017, The New York Times broke the first reports of decades of sexual misconduct claims against film producer Harvey Weinstein. On October 10, 2017, journalist Ronan Farrow reported further allegations Weinstein had sexually assaulted or harassed thirteen women, and raped three.

Weinstein was immediately dismissed from The Weinstein Company. Weinstein had suppressed these cases through confidential financial settlements and nondisclosure agreements, as was common for celebrity sexual harassment cases, before journalists aired the story. Over eighty accusers came forward against Weinstein, including many well-known actresses.

Impact

Jim Rutenberg of The New York Times said the Weinstein scandal precipitated a "national reckoning" against sexual harassment and assault in the United States, which became known as the Weinstein effect. USA Today wrote that 2017 was the year in which "sexual misconduct became a fireable offense".

Men and women aired claims of sexual misconduct in workplaces across multiple industries, leading to the swift international condemnation or removal of many men in positions of power. On Twitter, the #MeToo campaign also encouraged hundreds of thousands of people to share their stories. Examples of the Weinstein effect are numerous, with Screen Junkies creator and former Senior Vice President of Content for Defy Media Andy Signore; animators John Lasseter, John Kricfalusi and Chris Savino; actors such as Kevin Spacey, Jeffrey Tambor, Dustin Hoffman, Cuba Gooding Jr. and Louis C.K.; and filmmakers Brett Ratner and James Toback all being affected. In the journalism industry, allegations led to the firing of editors, publishers, executives, and hosts, including high-profile television figures such as Charlie Rose, Mark Halperin, and Matt Lauer. In politics, accusations of varying degrees of severity were made against U.S. House Representative John Conyers (D-MI) and U.S. Senator Al Franken (D-MN), both of whom resigned their seats in Congress, and Roy Moore (R-AL), who lost his 2017 bid for election to the United States Senate. Celebrity chefs Mario Batali and John Besh were also removed.

Two supporters of the #MeToo movement were also accused. CBS chairman and CEO Leslie Moonves was one of Hollywood's most prominent supporters of the #MeToo Movement and a founding member of the "Commission on Sexual Harassment and Advancing Equality in the Workplace", formed in late 2017 to "tackle the broad culture of abuse and power disparity". On July 27, 2018, six women, including actress Illeana Douglas, accused him of sexually harassing them. On August 19, 2018, an article published in The New York Times detailed allegations that Asia Argento sexually assaulted Jimmy Bennett, a then-17-year-old actor and musician, in a California hotel in 2013, and arranged to pay $380,000 to her accuser. Bennett was under the California age of consent, which is 18 years of age, and says he was given alcohol under the age of 21. Argento was a leading Weinstein accuser and prominent #MeToo movement leader.

The Weinstein effect was felt outside the United States, especially, but not solely, in the English-speaking world. In the United Kingdom, allegations of sexual misconduct against many British politicians became a public scandal involving dozens of women accusers across decades and political parties. It led to the resignations of Defence Secretary Michael Fallon, Cabinet Secretary Damian Green, and Welsh minister Carl Sargeant (who died by suicide four days after his dismissal). In January 2018, reports of sexual harassment at the high-society Presidents Club charity dinner caused another scandal. In Canada, accusations against Just for Laughs comedy festival founder Gilbert Rozon led to his resignation, and 15 people accused Quebec radio host Éric Salvail of sexual misconduct. Broadcaster and former baseball player Gregg Zaun was fired.

Analysis
American journalists in conversation at NPR spoke of the allegations feeling like a tipping point for societal treatment of sexual misconduct. They distinguished the moment from prior sexual misconduct public debates by the public trust in the accusers, who in this case were celebrities familiar to the public, rather than the accusers in prior cases, in which the accusers were unknown and became famous for their testimony. Social media provides a platform for women to share their experiences and encouragement on a scale that had not existed during prior public debates. The state of California is considering legislation to ban closed door sexual harassment settlements.

Two columnists of the USA Today expressed doubt that the trend of public opinion would hold, citing open, public cases with few consequences, such as R. Kelly (the column was made before Surviving R. Kelly aired and Kelly's subsequent arrest.) and Donald Trump (see Donald Trump sexual misconduct allegations). The Weinstein effect also caused some to question the place of Bill Clinton within the Democratic Party due to the sexual misconduct allegations against him. Journalist Jenny Nordberg published a New York Times article in protest against the prosecution and conviction of actress Cissi Wallin, one of the many accusers of journalist Fredrik Virtanen, and her criticism of the difficulties the Me Too movement faces in Sweden.

See also
 HimToo movement
 "Yewtree effect" (following the Jimmy Savile sexual abuse scandal)
 MeToo movement
 Believe women
 2017–18 United States political sexual scandals
 Post-assault treatment of sexual assault victims
 Time's Up
 List of name changes due to the George Floyd protests

References

Further reading

 

 

 

 

 

 

 

 

2017 beginnings
2017 in the United States
2017 in Los Angeles
2017 controversies
2017 controversies in the United States
2017 scandals
Fourth-wave feminism
Political sex scandals in the United States
October 2017 events in the United States
November 2017 events in the United States
Rapes in the United States
Sex crimes
Sexual abuse
Sexual harassment
Child sexual abuse
Sexism
Sexual abuse cover-ups
Sexual assaults in the United States
Sexual misconduct allegations
Sexual harassment in the United States
Violence against children
Violence against men
Violence against women
Violence against women in the United States
Sexual harassment journalism
Social phenomena
MeToo movement